Pokrovske is a village in Holovanivsk Raion of Kirovohrad Oblast, Ukraine, located at . It belongs to Haivoron urban hromada, one of the hromadas of Ukraine. 

Until 18 July 2020, Pokrovske belonged to Haivoron Raion. The raion was abolished in July 2020 as part of the administrative reform of Ukraine, which reduced the number of raions of Kirovohrad Oblast to four. The area of Haivoron Raion was merged into Holovanivsk Raion.

References

Villages in Holovanivsk Raion